Aai is a 2004 Indian Tamil-language action masala film written and directed by A. Venkatesh. The film stars Sarathkumar in the main lead role, with Namitha as his love interest. Vadivelu, Kalabhavan Mani, Ashish Vidyarthi, Kota Srinivasa Rao, and Vincent Asokan plays supporting roles. The film released on 17 December 2004 and became a hit.

Plot
Sakthivel alias Velu is a tubelight seller who is living happily with his sister Lakshmi and friend Pazhani in Palani. He stays away from all wanted troubles and arguments and is forced to resort to fighting to defend his sister from the local rowdy Raghavan.

A flashback follows, where it is revealed that Velu is a military officer and Lakshmi is actually the sister of his best friend, Police Officer Mani of Chennai, who wants her to become a collector. Velu and Mani both clean up the society by punishing corrupt police officers. One day, Mani notices a wine shop opposite to the school where his wife Kanmani teaches. Mani, Kanmani, Velu, and the schoolchildren destroy the wine shop by throwing and breaking bottles and Velu burning the shop.

The shop is owned by Naachiyar. Naachiyar threatens Velu that he will destroy the school, but Velu prevents him by pouring oil at him, saying that before he destroys the school, Velu will destroy him. The next day, two wine shop men hide a bomb inside the school, under Naachiyar's plan. After getting a call from Kanmani, Velu and Mani both save the school children and Kanmani altogether. Unfortunately, Mani gets stabbed by a wine shop man and was thrown off from the school building. Velu tries to save Mani, but he dies. Mani gave an important wish to Velu, saying that his desire is to make his sister a collector.

Later, Velu drags Naachiyar from the police department, shows Mani's ashes to him, and then shoots him twice. It is also revealed that Velu had gone into hiding and maintained a low profile to protect him and Lakshmi from Naachiyar. After shooting Naachiyar, the military court said that Velu is innocent, but had resigned from his military job to take care of Lakshmi and makes sure that she becomes a collector, as Mani wished.

Cast

 Sarathkumar as Sakthivel (Velu), a military officer
 Namitha as Anjali, Shakthivel's love interest
 Vadivelu as  Pazhani
 Kalabhavan Mani as Mani, Velu's best friend
 Kota Srinivasa Rao as Naachiyar, an illegal wine shop owner (flashback antagonist)
 Vincent Asokan as Raghavan, the local Palani rowdy (present antagonist)
 Ashish Vidyarthi as Dindigal DSP Easwara Pandian, the corrupt police officer of Chennai and Naachiyar's sidekick
 Thalaivasal Vijay as Inspector, the corrupt police officer of Palani and Raghavan's sidekick
 Vijayakumar as DGP, Police Commissioner of Chennai
 Thyagu as Inspector Vavval Pandi
 Ponnambalam as Inspector Kalyanaraman
 Ilavarasu as Traffic Police Officer Subbarayan
 Mayoori as Kanmani, Mani's wife
 Rithika as Lakshmi, Mani's sister (later, Velu takes care of her)
 Paravai Muniyamma as Anjali's grandmother 
 Bonda Mani as Auto Driver
 Crane Manohar as Customer
 Scissor Manohar as Pickpocket
 Joker Thulasi as Bus Conductor
 Manager Cheena as Post Office Customer
 Tirupur Ramasamy as Post Office Customer
 Kottai Perumal as Police Constable
 Kovai Senthil as Achari
 Priyanka as Widow
 Bava Lakshmanan
 Bayilvan Ranganathan
 M. Seenivasan
 Jayamani
 Kumaresan
 Vengal Rao
 Vijay Ganesh
 Robo Shankar as Army Man (uncredited role)
 Mumtaj in an item song a belly dancer.

Soundtrack

Soundtrack was composed by Srikanth Deva.

Release and reception
Due to producer's financial crunch, Aai took 4 months to come out.

Malini Mannath of Chennai Online wrote "It’s a rehash of so many earlier films [..] - that one loses count of the ‘inspirations’! There's nothing fresh by way of script or narrative style here. As for Sharat, though he plays the angry man with a vengeance, it's what he's done in his earlier films". Visual Dasan of Kalki wrote 'when public does wrong the police retorts, who will retort if police does wrong', this one line plot is backed up by a screenplay with love, action and comedy which saves the film from faltering. At the same time the lengthy climax towards the end gives a headache.

References

External links 

 

2004 films
2000s Tamil-language films
Films shot in Chalakudy
Indian action films
2000s masala films
Films scored by Srikanth Deva
Films shot in Palani
Films directed by A. Venkatesh (director)
2004 action films
Films shot in Thrissur